GMERS Medical College and Hospital, Himmatnagar is a medical college in Himmatnagar, Gujarat. Established in 2014, the college offers a degree in Bachelor of Medicine and Surgery (MBBS). Nursing and para-medical courses are also offered. The college is affiliated with Hemchandracharya North Gujarat University and is recognized by the Medical Council of India. The hospital associated with the college is one of the largest hospitals in the Himmatnagar. Entry into the college is via merit through the National Eligibility and Entrance Test. 

Yearly undergraduate student intake is 200.

Courses
The college educates and trains students in MBBS courses. The college offered 200 MBBS seats in 2019, 85% of which are of state quota and 15% for Nation Counselling.

References

External links 
 http://gmersmedicalcollegehimmatnagar.in/

Medical colleges in Gujarat